Askland is a village in Åmli municipality in Agder county, Norway. The village is located in the Gjøvdal valley, just north of the river Gjøv. From 1908 until 1960, the Gjøvdal valley was the separate municipality of Gjøvdal which had Askland as its administrative centre. Gjøvdal Church is located in Askland.

References

Villages in Agder
Åmli